Pinstripes are a pattern of very thin stripes of any color running in parallel. The pattern is often found in fashion.

The pinstripe is often compared to the similar chalk stripe. Pinstripes are very thin, often  in width, and are created with one single-warp yarn.

Although found mostly in men's suits, any type of fabric can be pinstriped. Pinstripes were originally worn only on suit pants but upon being adopted in America during the 20th century they were also used on suit jackets. The Chicago Cubs' baseball uniforms have had pinstripes since 1907 and they are recognized as the first Major League Baseball team to incorporate pinstriping into a baseball uniform Many other former and current Major League Baseball teams—including the Florida Marlins, Minnesota Twins, Montreal Expos, Colorado Rockies, New York Mets, New York Yankees, Chicago White Sox, Detroit Tigers, Philadelphia Phillies, Houston Astros and the San Diego Padres—later adopted pinstripes on their own uniforms. The Yankees, in particular, are associated with the pattern. This was later carried over into the National Basketball Association, with teams like the Chicago Bulls, Charlotte Hornets and Orlando Magic incorporating pinstripes into their uniforms. In baseball lingo, the term "wearing pinstripes" has become synonymous with being a member of the Yankees, despite other teams using them in their uniforms.

References to pinstripes can be found in Geoffrey Chaucer's The Canterbury Tales (written between 1387 and 1400), where the Sergeant at the Law is described as wearing "a homely parti-coloured coat girt with a silken belt of pin-stripe stuff". Pinstripes have been found on suits since the early 19th century. They were used by banks in London to identify their employees.

References

Textile patterns

de:Nadelstreifen